Gobblet is a board game for two players designed by Thierry Denoual and published in 2001 by Gigamic and Blue Orange Games. Gobblet was a finalist for the 2004 Jeu de l'année.

The game is played on a 4×4 board. Each player has 12 pieces of the same colour but different sizes.  Players take turns to place a piece on the board or move their piece that already is on the board. Bigger pieces can be placed so that they cover smaller ones. A player wins by placing four pieces of the same colour in a horizontal, vertical, or diagonal row.

In 2003, Gigamic and Blue Orange Games released Gobblet Junior, a version of the game for younger players, which is played on a 3×3 board.

In 2009, Blue Orange Games published revisioned editions: Gobblet X4 and Gobblet Gobblers to replace Gobblet and Gobblet Jr. accordingly.

External links
Blue Orange Games: Gobblet
Gobblet ranked as one of the top 11 Geek Board Games
Gobblet Review at BellaOnline.com
Play Gobblet online at Boardspace.net, against human or robot opponents
Gobblet Gobblers review
Gobblet is proclaimed test winner in Politiken, a major Danish newspaper
rule

Board games introduced in 2001
Abstract strategy games